Jeunesse Sportive de la Saoura is a professional football club based in Méridja in the Béchar Province, Algeria, which plays in Algerian Ligue Professionnelle 1.
This chronological list comprises all those who have held the position of manager of the first team of JS Saoura from 2008, when the first professional manager was appointed, to the present day. Each manager's entry includes his dates of tenure and the club's overall competitive record (in terms of matches won, drawn and lost), honours won and significant achievements while under his care. Caretaker managers are included, where known. As of the start of the 2021–22 season, JS Saoura have had 21 full-time managers.

Background

List of managers
Information correct as of 9 April 2022. Only competitive matches are counted.

Managers

See also
JS Saoura

References

JS Saoura
JS Saoura
JS Saoura